Kombat Armouring is a Russian armoured vehicle and car manufacturer.  The first prototype was called the Laura. The company's slogan is Protection without Compromise.

History
The Laura was followed by the Ohta minivan in 1987. In 1990, Kombat Armouring acquired a military factory in Saint Petersburg, where it still produces vehicles today. From 1993 onwards, Kombat Armouring has been producing armoured vehicles for local courier services. From 1995–1998 they produced the Laura 3 which was based on the Pontiac Fiero.

Models

Laura (1985)
Ohto (1987)
Luaz-Proto (1988)
Kamas (1989)
Pilot (1990)
Laura 3 (1995)
Kanonir (1998)
Cornet
Gelendvagen
Combat T-98 (2005) still current

See also

 Dartz

References

External links
 Armoring Group official page

Truck manufacturers of Russia
Defence companies of Russia
Manufacturing companies based in Saint Petersburg
Vehicle manufacturing companies established in 1985
1985 establishments in the Soviet Union
Russian brands